Roine may refer to:

 Rhone (Roine in Aragonese and Catalan), a river in Switzerland and France
 Roine (Finland), a lake in Finland
 Roine (name)